Taije Silverman is an American poet, translator, and professor. She currently teaches at the Department of English at the University of Pennsylvania.

Biography 
Taije Silverman was born in San Francisco, California (1974). Her father was a real estate developer and architect and her mother an art teacher. She has lived in different cities in the United States including Houston, Berkeley, Atlanta, New York, D.C., Ithaca, Princeton, and Charlottesville. She is a 1996 graduate of Vassar College.

Literary career
Silverman is a widely recognized contemporary poet. She is the author of Houses Are Fields, a book of poetry, published by LSU Press in 2009, and selected as the debut book in their Sea Cliff Series.  The book is about responding to her mother's death.  US Poet Laureate Natasha Trethewey called Houses Are Fields "one of the most beautiful books I've read in years." Silverman's individual poems have been published in journals including Poetry, The Harvard Review, Ploughshares, Massachusetts Review, The Antioch Review and AGNI. Houses Are Fields appeared in Italian translation in 2013 (Le Case Sono Campi, trans. Giorgia Pordenoni, Oedipus Edizioni). Silverman's poems are also featured in the premier anthology of contemporary American poetry, The Best American Poetry (2016, 2017). Her poetry focuses on intimacy and loss, and is characterized by a style of strong narrative and deep but fragmented lyricism.

Silverman is considered one of the most innovative contemporary English translators of Italian poetry. She is best known for her translations of Giovanni Pascoli, which have appeared in The Nation, New England Review, Agni, Pleiades and Modern Poetry in Translation. This work culminated in the publication of Selected Poems of Giovanni Pascoli by Princeton University Press, which Jonathan Galassi calls "a lyrical and learned introduction to one of modern Italy's essential poets." Silverman has also translated Pier Paolo Pasolini's dialect poetry and poems by Paolo Valesio.

She has taught at the University of Bologna in Italy under a Fulbright fellowship, Ursinus College, and Emory University, where she also served as the creative writing fellow. Silverman has also served as a teaching fellow at the University of Maryland and University of Houston. Previously, she worked as a poetry instructor in public schools through the Writers-in-the-Schools program.

Awards and recognition 
 W.K. Rose Fellowship
 Emory University Poetry Fellowship
 Fulbright Research Scholarship (2010-2011)
 MacDowell Colony Residence
 Virginia Center for Creative Arts Residence
 Academy of American Poets - Anais Nin Award
 Anne Halley Prize for Poetry (2016)

References

External links
Selected work

Poems
 Philtrum (from The Harvard Review)
 Take It Everything (from The Missouri Review)
 Poem to Keep What I Love (from Poetry Magazine)
 Spiritual Evaluation and Grief (from Massachusetts Review)
 Cinerem (from Pleiades)
 If Then (from Brooklyn Poets)
 On Joy and Grief, with an essay on the poems by Eleanor Wilner (from Shining Rock)
 Profile on Brooklyn Poets

Translations
 Autumn Journal by Giovanni Pascoli (from The Nation)
 Night-Blooming Jasmine by Giovanni Pascoli (from Five Points) 
 In the Fog, Laundresses, Hens, The Ox, Holiday Morning, Lightning, Thunder, Valentino, The Hour in Barga, Fides by Giovanni Pascoli (from Asymptote)

Interviews
 Interview with Brooklyn Poets, May 2013
 Interview and reading on The Front Row, KUHF Public Radio, Houston, TX, March, 2010
 Discussion at "Italian Poetry Review", December 3, 2008

1974 births
Living people
University of Houston alumni
Vassar College alumni
American women poets
University of Pennsylvania faculty
21st-century American poets
21st-century American translators
American women academics
21st-century American women writers